Dangelan (also Romanized as dangelan and Dangelan) is a village in Sadan Rostaq-e Sharqi Rural District, in the Central District of Kordkuy County, Golestan Province, Iran. At the 2006 census, its population was 348, in 88 families.

References 

Populated places in Kordkuy County